Anna Vaccarella (Cagua, Aragua, August 31, 1968) is a Venezuelan journalist. She currently works in radio show on Unión Radio.

Career 
At 17 years of age, Vaccarella moved to Caracas to study journalism at the Andrés Bello Catholic University, where she graduated first of its class.

She began her career in RCTV, where worked as a journalist for 10 years. Vaccarella started as a correspondent, then with only 24 years old, she led Alerta, a newsmagazine television program. She also ventured into radio and worked for 8 years in Kys FM 101.5.

After she left RCTV Vaccarella joins Venevisión, where she had the opportunity to work as news anchor together with journalists Unai Amenabar and Eduardo Rodríguez. She worked in Venevisión for 12 years, until December 2013. Then, she decides to return to the radio to be the host of the program En Sintonía transmitted by Unión Radio 90.3 FM.

Personal life 
In 2005, Vaccarella marries her colleague Román Lonzinski. The couple had difficulties to conceive but as a result of in vitro treatments, her twins Isabella and Sofia were born on May 7, 2011.

On July 31, 2015, Vaccarella sent a statement in which she revealed that after having a hysterectomy, the results of the biopsy showed that she had non-Hodgkin lymphoma, a type of cancer that attacks lymph cells and bone marrow.

On February 2, 2016, she underwent a bone marrow transplant in New York City. Approximately five months later, Vaccarella returned to Venezuela and resumed her work at Unión Radio.

References 

1968 births
People from Aragua
Venezuelan women journalists
Living people
Andrés Bello Catholic University alumni